Lake Elmo is a city in Washington County, Minnesota, United States. The population was 11,335 at the 2020 census. According to 2021 census estimates, the city is estimated to have a population of 12,899.

Much of the area within the city limits is still farmland, giving the city a rural appearance. Following the loss of a lawsuit against the Metropolitan Council, a regional planning authority, the Minnesota Supreme Court in 2005 ordered that Lake Elmo had to compile a plan in accordance with the Councils regional development guide. The population of Lake Elmo is developing rapidly. It is projected that by 2040, the population of the city will be over 21,000.

History
The city took its name from nearby Lake Elmo. Lake Elmo began with one farm in 1852 on the southwest corner of the intersection of what is now Manning Avenue and 30th Street, just southeast of downtown Lake Elmo and across the highway from the Lake Elmo Airport (FAA LID: 21D). The barn was originally built in 1875 and restored in 1998 as a house. The 1852 farmhouse was intentionally burned down in March 2007.

Government
Lake Elmo has a City Council that consists of a Mayor and four council members.  The City Council has the legislative authority and determines all matters of policy.  The Mayor and council members are elected to serve a four-year term.
The city also has a park commission and a planning commission.  The park commission is there to advise the City Council on issues regarding the development, improvement and maintenance of the city's parks and trails.  The planning commission is there to make recommendations regarding the Comprehensive Plan and amendments to the plan, site plans, subdivisions, conditional use permits, planning, zoning and sign regulations, open space preservation developments, and other planning related items.

The members include:

Mayor – Mike Charles Cadenhead 

Council members – Jeff Holtz, Katrina Beckstrom , Dale Dorschner, and Lisa McGinn 

Planning Commission Members – Charles Cadenhead (Chair), Jeff Holtz, Jordan Graen, Kyle Risner, Brian Steil, Kathy Weeks, Brandon Mueller 

Park Commission Members – John Ames, Jean Olinger, Barry Weeks, John Mayek, Isak Nightingale, Steve Schumacher

Geography

Minnesota State Highway 36 runs east–west along Lake Elmo's northern boundary line.  Interstate 94 runs east–west along Lake Elmo's southern boundary line.  County State-Aid Highway 14 serves as the main east-west route, while County State-Aid Highway 17 serves as the main north-south route.

Demographics

2010 census
As of the census of 2010, there were 8,069 people, 2,779 households, and 2,252 families living in the city. The racial makeup of the city was 92.3% White, 0.8% African American, 0.3% Native American, 3.3% Asian, 1.3% from other races, and 1.9% from two or more races. Hispanic or Latino of any race were 3.5% of the population.

There were 2,779 households, of which 38.0% had children under the age of 18 living with them, 70.7% were married couples living together, 6.8% had a female householder with no husband present, 3.6% had a male householder with no wife present, and 19.0% were non-families. 14.9% of all households were made up of individuals, and 4.6% had someone living alone who was 65 years of age or older. The average household size was 2.88 and the average family size was 3.21.

The median age in the city was 42.4 years. 27.1% of residents were under the age of 18; 6.3% were between the ages of 18 and 24; 20.9% were from 25 to 44; 34.6% were from 45 to 64; and 11% were 65 years of age or older. The gender makeup of the city was 50.2% male and 49.8% female.

2000 census
As of the census of 2000, there were 6,863 people, 2,347 households, and 1,924 families living in the city. The racial makeup of the city was 95.82% White, 0.38% African American, 0.29% Native American, 1.75% Asian, 0.54% from other races, and 1.22% from two or more races. Hispanic or Latino of any race were 1.31% of the population.

There were 2,347 households, out of which 41.6% had children under the age of 18 living with them, 69.4% were married couples living together, 7.8% had a female householder with no husband present, and 18.0% were non-families. 13.1% of all households were made up of individuals, and 3.3% had someone living alone who was 65 years of age or older.  The average household size was 2.91 and the average family size was 3.19.

The population had 29.2% under the age of 18, 7.2% from 18 to 24, 29.3% from 25 to 44, 27.3% from 45 to 64, and 7.0% who were 65 years of age or older.  The median age was 37 years. For every 100 females, there were 102.7 males.  For every 100 females age 18 and over, there were 101.9 males.

The median income for a household in the city was $76,876, and the median income for a family was $84,562. Males had a median income of $56,667 versus $32,564 for females. The per capita income for the city was $33,007.  About 4.8% of families and 7.3% of the population were below the poverty line, including 12.6% of those under age 18 and 2.3% of those age 65 or over.

Education
Most of Lake Elmo is part of the Stillwater School District (#834), and is home to Lake Elmo Elementary School and Oak-Land Middle School.

Rasmussen College–Lake Elmo / Woodbury campus is located in Lake Elmo and serves students in the surrounding areas.  Rasmussen College is a career focused, regionally accredited college that offers bachelor and associate degree programs. Rasmussen college concentrates on programs in the following areas: health sciences, nursing, criminal justice, technology and design, business, and early education.

Baytown Township Groundwater Plume
The primary source area for the Baytown Township Groundwater Plume Contamination Superfund site is a property located at 11325 Stillwater Boulevard in Lake Elmo.  The property was used by a metal-working facility from 1940 to 1968.  The site is listed as a superfund site due to TCE contamination of a groundwater aquifer used for local drinking water supplies.

See also
 Lake Elmo
 Lake Elmo Airport

References

External links
 City website

Cities in Minnesota
Cities in Washington County, Minnesota
1852 establishments in Minnesota Territory
Populated places established in 1852